Valley Christian School is a private Christian school located in Spokane Valley, Washington, United States.

The school was founded in 1974 located in the previous University High School in Spokane Valley. It is a non-denominational, non-profit 501C3 school, and is accredited by ACSI and NASC. It is approved by the State of Washington and enrolls students in grades PreK-12.

The school promotes itself as providing a biblical worldview education for Christian families desiring a discipleship based Christian day school, and nearly 60 churches are represented in the families enrolled. The school maintains maximum class sizes of 25 in the elementary and 30 in the secondary, with an average class of 18 students.

On July 27, 2017, the school purchased the old University building that it been leasing for ten years at a price of $4.41 million from the Central Valley School District.

References

External links

Christian schools in Washington (state)
Educational institutions established in 1974
Private elementary schools in Washington (state)
High schools in Spokane County, Washington
Private middle schools in Washington (state)
Nondenominational Christian schools in the United States
Schools in Spokane County, Washington
Spokane Valley, Washington
Private high schools in Washington (state)